Park Sang-su (born 8 August 1953) is a South Korean athlete. He competed in the men's high jump at the 1972 Summer Olympics.

References

1953 births
Living people
Athletes (track and field) at the 1972 Summer Olympics
South Korean male high jumpers
Olympic athletes of South Korea
Place of birth missing (living people)
20th-century South Korean people